The Poland national beach soccer team represents Poland in international beach soccer competitions and is controlled by the PZPN, the governing body for beach soccer in Poland.

Competitive record

FIFA Beach Soccer World Cup Qualification (UEFA)

Current squad

Coach: Marcin Stanisławski

Achievements
 Euro Beach Soccer League Best: Third Place
 2006
 FIFA Beach Soccer World Cup Best: 11th place
 2006
FIFA World Cup qualification tournament Best: Champions
 2017

External links
 BSWW Profile
 Official website
 Profile on Beach Soccer Russia

Beach soccer in Poland
European national beach soccer teams
beach soccer